Allan Howland is an American politician. He serves as a Democratic member for the Strafford 20th district of the New Hampshire House of Representatives.

Life and career 
Howland is a former high school science teacher.

In November 2022, Howland defeated Mark Racic in the general election for the Strafford 20th district of the New Hampshire House of Representatives, winning 71 percent of the votes. He assumed office in December 2022.

References 

Living people
Year of birth missing (living people)
Place of birth missing (living people)
Democratic Party members of the New Hampshire House of Representatives
21st-century American politicians